Martens Daniel Jordan Rowsing (born 25 February 1999) is a Singaporean professional footballer who last played as a midfielder for Singapore Premier League club Tanjong Pagar United FC. He made his senior debut while on loan from Hougang United FC at Albirex Niigata Singapore.

Career statistics

Club

Notes

International Statistics

U19 International caps

References

1999 births
Living people
Singaporean footballers
Association football midfielders
Singapore Premier League players
Tanjong Pagar United FC players
Warriors FC players
Hougang United FC players
Albirex Niigata Singapore FC players